Bandarban (Chakma: 𑄝𑄚𑄴𑄘𑄧𑄢𑄴𑄝𑄚𑄴, Marma: ဘန်ဒါဘန်) is a district in South-Eastern Bangladesh, and a part of the Chittagong Division. It is one of the three hill districts of Bangladesh and a part of the Chittagong Hill Tracts, the others being Rangamati District and Khagrachhari District. Bandarban district (4,479 km2) is not only the most remote district of the country, but also the least populous (population 388,000). There is an army contingent at Bandarban Cantonment.

Demographics

According to the 2011 Bangladesh census, Bandarban district had a population was 388,335, of which 203,350 were males and 184,985 females. Rural population was 287,912 (74.14%) while the urban population was 100,423 (25.86%). Bandarban district had a literacy rate of 35.86% for the population 7 years and above: 40.29% for males and 30.93% for females.

As per the 2011 census, there were 215,934 Bengalis and 142,401 (36.67%) indigenous people in the district. There are more than fifteen ethnic minorities living in the district besides the Bengalis, including: Marma, who are Arakanese descendants or Rakhine and are also known as Magh, Mru (also known as Mro or Murong), Bawm, Khyang, Tripura (also known as Tipra or Tipperah), Lushei (also known as Lushei), Khumi, Chak, Kuki, Chakma and Tanchangya (also spelt as Tenchungya).

The Mru, also known as Murong, who are famous for their music and dance. The Mru in major numbers have converted to the youngest religion in Bangladesh – Khrama (or Crama) – a religion that prohibits much of their old ways. They are proposed as the original inhabitants of Bandarban.

Religious composition

The religious composition of the population in 2011 was 50.75% Muslim, 31.69% Buddhist, 10.13% Christian, 3.38% Hindu and 4.05% others. Religious institutions is Mosque 2,070, Buddhist 900 (256 temples, 644 pagodas), Hindu temple 94 and Church 2.

Tourism
The India - Myanmar Sabroom - Cox's Bazar railway link has been proposed to connect Sabroom - Khargachari - Rangamati - Bandarban - Satkania - Cox's Bazar and another rail link connecting Bandarban to Tuipang, India.

Bandarban lies, by bus, eight hours away from Dhaka, two hours from Chittagong and three hours from Cox's Bazar.  It is also possible to get there by a six-hour bus ride from Rangamati. The Buddha Dhatu Jadi, the Buddhist temple in Bangladesh, located in Balaghata, 4 km from the town. This place attracts many tourists every year. This Theravada Buddhist temple is made completely in the style of South-East Asia and houses the second largest statue of the Buddha in Bangladesh.  The waterfall named Shoilo Propat at Milanchari is another place tourists like to visit. The numerous Buddhist temples, known as kyang in local tongue, and bhihars in the town include the highly notable the Rajvihar (royal vihar) at Jadipara and the Ujanipara Bhihar.  Bawm villages around Chimbuk, and Mru villages a little further off, are also lie within a day's journey from the town. Prantik Lake, Jibannagar and Kyachlong Lake are some more places of interest.  Boat ride on the river Shangu is one of the main attractions here for tourists.

Notable Persons

 Ushwe Sing
 Saching Prue Jerry
 Maa Ma Ching Marma

Notes

References

Further reading

 Lonely Planet Bangladesh (Lonely Planet Bangladesh) by Richard Plunkett, et al.
 
 Identity Politics in Central Asia and the Muslim World (Library of International Relations *Vol. 13) by Willem van Schendel (Editor), Erik J. Zurcher (Editor)
 Deforestation, Environment, and Sustainable Development: A Comparative Analysis by Dhirendra K. Vajpeyi (Editor)
 Minorities, Peoples And Self-determination: Essays in Honour of Patrick Thornberry by Nazila Ghanea (Editor)
 Brauns, Claus-Dieter, "The Mrus: Peaceful Hillfolk of Bangladesh", National Geographic Magazine, February 1973, Vol 143, No 1

External links

 
 Bandarban District mapped on OpenStreetMap, retrieved 29 December 2021.
 Chittagong Hill Tracts mapped on OpenStreetMap, retrieved 29 December 2021. (inset are its three districts: Khagrachari, Rangamaai, and Bandarban)
 Indigenous People of Bangladesh (archived 2008)
 Parbatya Chattagram Jana Samhati Samiti (archived 2006)

 
Districts of Chittagong Division
Districts of Bangladesh
Chittagong Hill Tracts conflict
Tourism in Bangladesh